The Andrew H. McCain Arena (formerly Acadia Arena) is a multi-purpose arena in Wolfville, Nova Scotia, Canada. It can seat 1,800 spectators for ice events and an extra 1,000 on the ice surface for other events. It was built in 1988, and features an Olympic sized ice surface.  It is home to the Acadia Axemen ice hockey team.  Has also hosted exhibition games featuring Team Canada, NHL old-timers and the American Hockey League.  The arena was the training site for the Soviets for the 1990 World Figure Skating Championships, which were held in Halifax.  The arena has also hosted many concerts, and the eclipse scene from Dolores Claiborne was filmed here.

Acadia University
Indoor arenas in Nova Scotia
Indoor ice hockey venues in Canada
Buildings and structures in Kings County, Nova Scotia
Sports venues in Nova Scotia
Tourist attractions in Kings County, Nova Scotia
Music venues in Nova Scotia